The Adrianna vineyard, planted at almost 5,000’ elevation in the Andes foothills, lies on the westernmost border of Tupungato Alto, Mendoza, Argentina, in a small district called Gualtallary. It belongs to the Bodega Catena Zapata. Being the highest vineyard in Mendoza, it benefits from the cooling effect   of the Andes Mountains and intense sunlight  resulting from extreme high altitude. The increased sunlight intensity due to altitude translates into thicker grape skins, because the grapevine attempts to protect its seeds from the sun. Grape skins are rich in tannins and polyphenols, the flavour-giving compounds in wine, explaining why the Adrianna Vineyard's high-altitude wines are so concentrated and capable of ageing. Also, because of the cool mountain climate, the wines from Adrianna have a certain type of minerality  in the aromatics and palate that is not found in wines from other parts of Mendoza. The soils  of Catena Zapata´s Adrianna Vineyard are composed of limestone and large pebbles that make them particularly well drained; the yields are naturally low and berries are small and concentrated
Adrianna is possibly the world’s most studied vineyard. The Adrianna Vineyard is well known for its single parcel Chardonnay wines White Bones and White Stones. and its Malbec, which have been highly reviewed by world wine publications 

Robert Parker of The Wine Advocate awarded a perfect 100-point score to the 2016 vintage of River Stones Malbec.

References

Vineyards
Wine regions of Argentina
Wine brands
Mendoza, Argentina